Rasul Rza (real name Rasul Ibrahim oghlu Rzayev – ) (1910 – 1981 in Baku), was an Azerbaijani writer, Hero of Socialist Labour (1980), People's Poet of Azerbaijan, Laureate of Soviet State Award and the Chairman of the Writers' Union of Azerbaijan. He was the husband of Azerbaijani writer Nigar Rafibeyli and the father of writer Anar Rzayev.

Life and writings

Rasul Rza was born Rasul Ibrahim oglu Rzayev on May 19, 1910 in Goychay. He studied in Transcaucasus Communist University, Azerbaijan Scientific Research Institute and Soviet Cinematography Institute. Rasul Rza was Chairman of Writers' Union of Azerbaijan in 1939, minister of Azerbaijani Cinematography (1945–48), chief editor of the Azerbaijani Soviet Encyclopedia (1966–75), member of board of directors of USSR Union of Writers (from 1964). With start of his career he adopted a shortened name Rasul Rza.

His first poem was called Bu gün (Today), published in Tbilisi. His serious multidimensional writings began in the 1930s. During the Great Patriotic War, he published many novels calling for patriotic spirit. He also wrote a poem about Lenin. In the 60s, he began writing in more philosophical tone relating his novels to intellectual themes, analytical thinking, philosophical approach to daily life and so forth. The lyrical poems, dramas, proses he wrote hinted to sustained and subtle criticism of the Soviet regime, for which was banned to write for a period of time. Additionally, he began composing songs to his poems.

He died in Baku on April 1, 1981 and was buried in Fakhri Khiyaban. A commemoration ceremony was held in his honor in Ankara in 2010.
The writers of Azerbaijan started a Rasul Rza Foundation and present awards to successful writers. It is chaired by Fikrat Goja.

References

External links
Mark with depiction of Rasul Rza's portrait in honor of 90th anniversary

1910 births
1981 deaths
People from Goychay District
Azerbaijani writers
Soviet writers
Soviet translators
Soviet dramatists and playwrights
Azerbaijani translators
Translators to Azerbaijani
Azerbaijani atheists
20th-century Azerbaijani dramatists and playwrights
Honored Art Workers of the Azerbaijan SSR